Yeo Oh-hyun  (Hangul: 여오현; born ) is a South Korean male volleyball player. He currently plays the libero position for the Cheonan Hyundai Capital Skywalkers.

Career

Clubs
Yeo, a 5-foot-9 (1.75 m) libero, played outside hitter for Hongik University for two years before converting to libero in the 1998–99 collegiate season. 
In the 2000 Super League semi-pro  draft, Yeo was selected seventh  overall by Samsung Fire Volleyball Club.

As the starting libero, Yeo helped the Samsung Fire Bluefangs win the national championship 11 times in the semi-pro Super League (2001−2004) and pro V-League (2005, 2008−2013).

After the 2012–13 V-League season, Yeo signed a contract with the  Cheonan Hyundai Capital Skywalkers as a free agent. In the 2016–17 season, Yeo won his eighth V-League championship, leading the Skywalkers to their third V-League title.

National team
In June 2001 Yeo was first selected for the South Korean senior national team to compete at the 2001 Asian Championship, where South Korea won the gold medal and he was named Best Receiver of the tournament.

Yeo took part as the starting libero for the South Korean national team at the 2003 Asian Championship, where the team won the back-to-back gold medal and he earned Best Digger honors.

At the 2008 AVC Cup, Yeo was named Best Receiver and Best Libero of the tournament. South Korea lost to Iran in the gold medal game.

He was also a member of the national team at the 2003 FIVB World Cup, 2006 FIVB World Championship and 2007 FIVB World Cup.

Yeo retired from the national team after the 2012 Olympic Qualification Tournament.

Individual awards

Club
 2015 V-League - Best Libero
 2016 V-League - Best Libero

National Team
 2001 Asian Championship - Best Receiver
 2003 Asian Championship - Best Digger
 2005 Asian Championship - Best Libero
 2007 Asian Championship - Best Libero
 2008 AVC Cup - Best Libero, Best Receiver
 2009 Asian Championship - Best Libero, Best Digger

External links
 Yeo Oh-hyun at the International Volleyball Federation (FIVB)

1978 births
Living people
South Korean men's volleyball players
Asian Games medalists in volleyball
Volleyball players at the 2002 Asian Games
Volleyball players at the 2006 Asian Games
Volleyball players at the 2010 Asian Games
Sportspeople from Incheon
Asian Games gold medalists for South Korea
Asian Games bronze medalists for South Korea
Medalists at the 2002 Asian Games
Medalists at the 2006 Asian Games
Medalists at the 2010 Asian Games
South Korean Buddhists
21st-century South Korean people